Aleksey Bazarov born 14 October 1963) is a retired USSR-born Israeli athlete who specialized in the 400 metres hurdles.

He became Soviet champion in 1990, and represented the Soviet Union in hurdles and relay (where the team finished eighth) at the 1990 European Championships. He won his first Israeli championship in 1992, and would win four national titles in total; one of them in the 400 metres. He also competed at the 1992 Olympic Games, the 1993 World Championships and the 1994 European Championships without reaching the final.

His personal best time was 49.33 seconds, achieved in June 1988 in Leningrad.

See also
List of Israeli records in athletics
List of Maccabiah records in athletics

References

External links
 

1963 births
Living people
Soviet male hurdlers
Israeli male hurdlers
Athletes (track and field) at the 1992 Summer Olympics
Olympic athletes of Israel
Soviet emigrants to Israel
World Athletics Championships athletes for Israel